= Sirkanos =

Inland town of ancient Bithynia

Coordinates: 40°54′24″N 29°39′27″E

Sirkanos was an inland town of ancient Bithynia inhabited during Roman times.

Its site is tentatively located near Kayalı Dağ in Asiatic Turkey.
